Carlos Silva may refer to:

 Carlos Silva (baseball) (born 1979), Major League Baseball starting pitcher
 Carlos Silva (Portuguese footballer) (1902–?), Portuguese footballer
 Carlos Silva (sport shooter) (born 1952), Guatemalan sports shooter
 Carlos Silva (sprinter) (born 1926), Chilean Olympic sprinter
 Carlos Silva Valente (born 1948), Portuguese football referee
 Carlos Silva (hurdler) (born 1974), Portuguese hurdler
 Carlos Silva (cyclist) (born 1974), Colombian cyclist
 Carlos Alberto Silva (1939–2017), Brazilian football manager
 Chale Silva (1919–2009), Costa Rican footballer
 Carlos Silva (Colombian footballer) (born 1973), Colombian football manager and former footballer
 Carlos Eduardo Silva (born 1994), Brazilian indoor volleyball player

See also
 Carlos da Silva (born 1984), Portuguese footballer